Huayuan County is a county of Hunan Province, China, it is under the administration of Xiangxi Autonomous Prefecture.

Located on the western margin of the province and the south western Xiangxi, it is immediately adjacent to the borders of Guizhou Province and Chongqing Municipality. The county is bordered to the north and the northeast by Baojing County, to the southeast by Jishou City, to the south by Fenghuang County, to the west by Songtao County of Guizhou and Xiushan County of Chongqing. The county has 9 towns and 3 townships under its jurisdiction, the county seat is Huayuan Town.

Climate

See also
Paibi

References
www.xzqh.org

External links 

 
County-level divisions of Hunan
Xiangxi Tujia and Miao Autonomous Prefecture